Elita Veidemane (born December 9, 1955 in Riga) is a Latvian journalist, publicist and public worker. In 1980 she graduated from the Latvian State University Faculty of Philology, and from 1981 to 1988 worked for the newspaper Padomju Jaunatne (Soviet Youth). She worked as a Latvian language and literature teacher at a school in Jūrmala in the 1980s. From 1988 until its closure in 1992 she was the chief editor of the Latvian Popular Front publication Atmoda (Revival).

Since 2008 she is the Deputy Chief Editor of the daily newspaper Neatkarīgā Rīta Avīze.

References

Latvian journalists
Latvian women journalists
Latvian women writers
1955 births
Living people
Writers from Riga
University of Latvia alumni
Latvian schoolteachers